Geisberg is a name of several mountains in German, including:

 Geisberg (Middle Moselle)
 Geisberg (Geisberg Forest)

See also 
 Longer list of mountains named Geisberg on the German Wikipedia
 Château du Geisberg
 Battle of Geisberg (1793)
 Marek Geišberg
 Marián Geišberg